A people's history, or history from below, is a type of historical narrative which attempts to account for historical events from the perspective of common people rather than leaders. There is an emphasis on disenfranchised, the oppressed, the poor, the nonconformists, and otherwise marginal groups. The authors are typically on the left and have a Marxist model in mind, as in the approach of the History Workshop movement in Britain in the 1960s.

"History from below" and "people's history" 
Lucien Febvre first used the phrase "histoire vue d'en bas et non d'en haut" (history seen from below and not from above) in 1932 when praising Albert Mathiez for seeking to tell the "histoire des masses et non de vedettes" (history of the masses and not of starlets). It was also used in the title of A. L. Morton's 1938 book, A People's History of England. Yet it was E. P. Thompson's essay History from Below in The Times Literary Supplement (1966) which brought the phrase to the forefront of historiography from the 1970s. It was popularized among non-historians by Howard Zinn's 1980 book, A People's History of the United States.

Description
A people's history is the history as the story of mass movements and of the outsiders.  Individuals not included in the past in other type of writing about history are part of history-from-below theory's primary focus, which includes the disenfranchised, the oppressed, the poor, the nonconformists, the subaltern and the otherwise forgotten people. This theory also usually focuses on events occurring in the French Revolution, or when an overwhelming wave of smaller events cause certain developments to occur. This approach to writing history is in direct opposition to methods which tend to emphasize single great figures in history, referred to as the Great Man theory; it argues that the driving factor of history is the daily life of ordinary people, their social status and profession. These are the factors that "push and pull" on opinions and allow for trends to develop, as opposed to great people introducing ideas or initiating events.

In his book A People's History of the United States, Howard Zinn wrote: "The history of any country, presented as the history of a family, conceals fierce conflicts of interest (sometimes exploding, most often repressed) between conquerors and conquered, masters and slaves, capitalists and workers, dominators and dominated in race and walks, and sex. And in such a world of conflict, a world of victims and executioners, it is the job of thinking people, as Albert Camus suggested, not to be on the side of the executioners."

Criticism
Historian Guy Beiner wrote that "the Neo-Marxist flag-bearers of history from below have at times resorted to idealized and insufficiently sophisticated notions of 'the people', unduly ascribing to them innate progressive values. In practice, democratic history is by no means egalitarian".

See also
Social history
Canada: A People's History (television documentary series)
George Rudé
Chris Harman
Marxist historiography
New labor history
Subaltern (postcolonialism)

References

Further reading

 A People's History of England by A. L. Morton (Victor Gollancz: London, 1938)
  
 An Indigenous Peoples' History of the United States by Roxanne Dunbar-Ortiz (Washington; Beacon Press, 2014)
 A People's History of the United States (in 8 volumes) by Page Smith (New York: McGraw-Hill, 1976–1987)
 A People's History of the Supreme Court by Peter Irons (New York: Viking, 1999)
 A People's History of the World by Chris Harman (London: Bookmarks, 1999)
 A People's History of the Second World War by Donny Gluckstein (Pluto Press, 2012)
 A People's History of World War II by Marc Favreau (New press, 2011)
 The Hundred Years War: A People's History by David green (Yale University Press, 2014)
 A People's History of the American Revolution: How Common People Shaped the Fight for Independence by Ray Raphael (New York: New Press, 2001)The Congo: From Leopold to Kabila: A People's History by Georges Nzongola-Ntalaja (London, NY: Zed, 2002)A People's History of the Vietnam War by Jonathan Neale (New York: New Press, 2003)
 The Assassination of Julius Caesar: A People's History of Ancient Rome by Michael Parenti (New York : New Press, 2003)A History of the Swedish People, Vol. 1: From Prehistory to the Renaissance by Vilhelm Moberg (Minneapolis: University of Minnesota Press, 2005)A History of the Swedish People, Vol. 2: From Renaissance to Revolution by Vilhelm Moberg (Minneapolis: University of Minnesota Press, 2005)A People's History of Science: Miners, Midwives, and "Low Mechaniks" by Clifford D. Conner (New York: Nation, 2005)A People's History of the Civil War: Struggles for the Meaning of Freedom by David Williams (New York: New Press, 2005)
 A People's Tragedy: The Russian Revolution: 1891-1924 by Orlando Figes (Penguin Books, 1998)
 A People's History of the Mexican Revolution by Adolfo Gilly (New York, NY: New Press, 2005)
 A People's History of the French Revolution by Eric Hazan (Verso, 2014)
 A People's History of Christianity: The Other Side of the Story by Dianna Butler Bass (Harper One, 2010)Christian Origins: A People's History of Christianity, Vol. 1 by Richard A. Horsley (Minneapolis: Fortress Press, 2005)Late Ancient Christianity: A People's History of Christianity, Vol. 2 by Virginia Burrus (Minneapolis: Fortress Press, 2005)The English Civil War: A People's History by Diane Purkiss (New York: Basic Books, 2006)Reformation Christianity: A People's History of Christianity by Peter Matheson and Denis R. Janz (Minneapolis: Fortress Press, 2007)The Darker Nations: A People's History of the Third World by Vijay Prashad (New York: New Press: W.W. Norton, 2007)A History of the Arab Peoples by Albert Hourani (Warner Books, 1992)
 Hearts and Minds: A People's History of Counterinsurgency by Hannah Gurman (New Press, 2013)
 A People's History of the U.S. Military by Michael A. Bellesiles (New Press, 2013)
 A People’s History of Poverty in America by Stephen Pimpare (New York: New Press ; London : Turnaround, 2008)
 A People's History of Environmentalism in the United States by Chad Montrie (Bloomsbury Academic, 2011)
 For All the People: Uncovering the Hidden History of Cooperation, Cooperative Movements, and Communalism in America by John Curl (PM Press, 2012)
 Collective Courage: A History of African American Cooperative Economic Thought and Practice by Jessica Gordon Nembhard (Penn State university press, 2014)
 A People’s History of Sports in the United States by Dave Zirin (New York; London: New Press, c2008)
 A People’s Art History of the United States by Nicolas Lampert (New press, 2010) 
 Downwind: A People's History of the Nuclear West by Sarah Alisabeth Fox (Bison Books, 2014)
 A People's History of London by Lindsey German & John rees (Verso, 2012)
 The Blood Never Dried: A People's History of the British Empire by John Newsinger (London: Bookmarks, 2009)
 A Renegade History of the United States by Thaddeus Russell (New York: Free Press, 2010)
 A People's History of Scotland'' by Chris Bambery (Verso, 2014)

External links

 libcom.org/history - Formerly peopleshistory.co.uk, a people's history website

World history
Historiography